Oru Kalluriyin Kathai is a 2005 Indian Tamil-language romantic drama film written and directed by newcomer Nandha Periyasamy. It stars Arya and Sonia Agarwal alongside an ensemble supporting cast including Jaivarma, Santhanam, and Charuhasan. The music was composed by Yuvan Shankar Raja with editing by Kola Bhaskar and cinematography by R. Madhi. The film released in 2005 and was deemed a success upon its release.

Plot

Satya (Arya) planned to meet his five friends after five years of leaving college. Unfortunately, his father comes only to inform that Satya is in a coma. In a psycho test conducted by his doctor (Charuhasan), Satya reveals some of the incidents that happened in the early years of his college life. It turns out that he is in love with Jothi (Sonia Agarwal) after she helps him get in a train that he was about to miss. When Jothi enters the same college where he studies, he was so happy since he could see her more often. However, he never confesses his love to her, and it lasted until the farewell day as he heard Jothi advising her friend about this. Satya's narration ended here as he started shouting in the doctor's room.

Following the doctor's advice, Satya's friends decided to follow a treatment which will help Satya wake himself up from the coma. Agreeing to this, his friends, Chandru (Jaivarma), David (Santhanam), and more contacted, all the students from the batch 2000, help in this treatment. When they go finding for Jothi at her house, it was found out that Jothi is already engaged. Still, Chandru hid the truth that Satya loves Jothi to make her agree to their plan, and she agreed.

The group of students then turned their now new modern college to an old college as it was in the year 2000. Satya was brought here and began to believe that it was the same time when he studied there and fell in love with Jothi. He waits until the farewell day as he was waiting five years ago. On the night before the farewell day, he found out that the current situation that he is facing is not the real one. He realizes that it is now 2005, not 2000 as he was thinking. Slowly, he began to remember what exactly happened five years ago on the farewell day.

Satya waited for Jothi outside a temple to confess his love, when someone hits his head from the back. He suddenly wakes up and came back to the present day and realized what his friends have done. On the last day, his friends forced him to propose to Jothi. Satya went to Jothi and asked her to stop the acting that his friends had asked and also not to cheat herself. He then walked away without saying his love. Jothi comes running towards Satya and tells him that she needs him and regrets why she wasted the five years not knowing his love for her. The couple then hugged each other followed by cheers from all the college students.

Cast

 Arya as Satya
 Sonia Agarwal as Jothi
 Jaivarma as Chandru
 Santhanam as David
 Charuhasan as Doctor
 Mouli as Principal
 Periyar Dasan as College Peon
 Thalaivasal Vijay as Taxi Driver
 Charle
 Nizhalgal Ravi
 Pyramid Natarajan
 Sasi
 Raja
 Manju
 Sai Madhavi

Soundtrack
The music, including the film score and soundtrack was composed by Yuvan Shankar Raja. The soundtrack released on 4 August 2005 and features 8 tracks with lyrics penned by Na. Muthukumar.

Critical reception
Indiaglitz wrote "The director Nandha Periyasamy deserves special mention for trying his hand at a difficult theme considering this to be his maiden venture." Sify wrote "On the whole Oru Kalooriyin Kathai is too high-concept for our audience with a slow paced narration that goes back and forth with a predictable climax." G. Ulaganathan of Deccan Herald wrote, "Weird and depressing. That in a nutshell is Oru Kalluriyin Kadhai [...] Yuvan Shankar Raja’s music is the only saving grace".

References

External links
 
 Oru Kalluriyin Kathai Preview at Behindwoods

2005 films
2005 romantic drama films
Indian romantic drama films
2000s Tamil-language films